Brachioteuthis behnii is a species of squid in the family Brachioteuthidae.

References 

Molluscs described in 1882
Squid